CHTT-FM is a Canadian radio station in Victoria, British Columbia, which airs at 103.1 FM. The station, owned by Rogers Sports & Media, airs an adult hits format branded as Jack 103.1. Its studios are located at 817 Fort Street in Downtown Victoria.

The station placed 7th (last) in the fall 2018 Numeris Diary Survey for Victoria.

History
CHTT began broadcasting on April 1, 1923 on the AM band as CFCL, airing on 410 meters (later on 910 kHz) with 500 watts of power, initially broadcasting a religious format under the ownership of the Centennial Methodist Church. In 1924, the CFCL studios relocated from the church to the Fletcher Brothers store on Douglas Street in Downtown Victoria. CFCL dropped its religious programming in 1925 when George Deauville bought the station and acquired a new licence for it, changed its call letters to CFCT and moved its studios to the Bank of Toronto (now part of Toronto-Dominion Bank) building on Douglas Street.

CFCT moved around on the AM band several times during the next 16 years as it switched to 630 kHz in 1928, to 1430 (with a power reduction to 50 watts) in 1933, and then to 1450 in 1935. It increased power back to 500 watts in 1939 before settling at 1480 on March 29, 1941 (following the Havana Treaty). The Victoria Times-Colonist bought CFCT on October 1, 1941 and sold a half-interest in the station to Taylor, Pearson & Carson Ltd., with the two entities forming the Island Broadcasting Co. as CFCT's parent company and changing its calls to CJVI; it became a charter affiliate of the Canadian Broadcasting Corporation's Dominion Network shortly after its formation in January 1944. When the Dominion Network dissolved in 1962, the station transferred its affiliation to the main CBC radio network.

CJVI moved to 900 AM on May 15, 1945. Taylor, Pearson & Carson acquired majority ownership of CJVI in 1951, and its studios relocated to its present location at 817 Fort Street in downtown Victoria in 1952. CJVI increased its power to 5000 watts on July 28, 1954 at 2:26 PM to increase its coverage up Vancouver Island to north of Nanaimo, south to Seattle and east to the Lower Mainland as far as Chilliwack. Power was further increased to 10,000 watts in April 1957. Harold Carson, part of the Taylor, Pearson & Carson firm that owned CJVI, died in 1959, and his company became Selkirk Communications that year.

In 1970, Selkirk acquired 100% ownership of CJVI, which switched to a country format in November 1972 and began branding as VI 90 on January 22, 1979. The country format was dropped for a mix of adult contemporary and adult standards music in January 1984 as CJVI began broadcasting in AM stereo, but the format went fully AC about a year later. More oldies music was gradually brought into the programming until CJVI had an all-oldies format by 1988. Maclean-Hunter Ltd. bought CJVI parent Selkirk Communications in 1989 and transferred the ownership to Rogers Media immediately afterward. CJVI dropped its CBC affiliation in 1991 (one of the last privately owned former affiliates to do so).

On September 1, 1995, CFMS-FM was purchased by Rogers from then-owner Capital Broadcasting, paired up with CJVI and renamed CIOC-FM on December 11. On April 1, 1997, CJVI dropped its oldies format for a news/talk format, identifying on-air as "AM 900, Victoria's Information Superstation", but dropped that format and returned to oldies music on July 10, 1999.

On September 2, 2000, CJVI moved to FM, switching frequencies and bands with Camosun College station CKMO as it moved to 103.1 MHz and became CHTT-FM, with a Top 40/CHR format branded as Hot 103; the first song played was "Bye, Bye, Bye" by N'Sync. In 2003, the format shifted to hot adult contemporary.

On January 29, 2004, after playing "Love Song" by Sky, CHTT flipped to adult hits branded as Jack FM. The first song played on "Jack" was "Sharp Dressed Man" by ZZ Top.

On February 24, 2015, CHTT flipped back to Top 40/CHR as KiSS 103.1. The last song played on "Jack" was "Hit the Road, Jack" by The Stampeders, while the first song on "KiSS" was "Uptown Funk" by Mark Ronson and Bruno Mars.

On August 7, 2019, all of the "KiSS" on-air staff were let go, and the station began promoting a major change to come the following week. On August 15, after playing a block of "goodbye"-themed songs ending with  "Bye, Bye, Bye" by N'Sync, CHTT changed its format back to adult hits and returned to its former "Jack" branding. The first song on the newly relaunched "Jack" was "Bohemian Rhapsody" by Queen.

References

External links

 

Htt
Htt
Htt
Radio stations established in 1923
1923 establishments in British Columbia
HTT
Jack FM stations